
The gens Jania was an obscure plebeian family at ancient Rome.  No members of this gens are mentioned in ancient writers, but several are known from inscriptions.

Members
 Lucius Janius, named in an inscription from Pompeii in Campania.
 Janius Firmus, dedicated a tomb at Rome for his wife, and for his daughter, Grapta.
 Jania Januaria, buried at Aquae in Dacia between AD 150 and 270, along with Gaius Janius Januarius and Janius Marcianus.
 Gaius Janius Januarius, buried at Aquae between AD 150 and 270, along with Janius Marcianus and Jania Januaria.
 Servius Janius Juventius, made an offering to Hercules Invictus at Sibrium in Gallia Transpadana, dating to the latter half of the third century.
 Janius Marcianus, buried at Aquae between AD 150 and 270, along with Gaius Janius Marcianus and Jania Januaria.

See also
 List of Roman gentes

References

Bibliography
 Theodor Mommsen et alii, Corpus Inscriptionum Latinarum (The Body of Latin Inscriptions, abbreviated CIL), Berlin-Brandenburgische Akademie der Wissenschaften (1853–present).
 René Cagnat et alii, L'Année épigraphique (The Year in Epigraphy, abbreviated AE), Presses Universitaires de France (1888–present).
 Inscriptiones Daciae Romanae (Inscriptions from Roman Dacia, abbreviated IDR), Bucharest (1975–present).

Roman gentes